is a passenger railway station located in the city of Tama, Tokyo, Japan, operated by the private railway operator Odakyu Electric Railway.

Lines
Karakida Station is the terminus of the Odakyu Tama Line, and is located 10.6 kilometers from the starting point of the line at Shin-Yurigaoka Station and 32.1 kilometers from Shinjuku Station.

Station layout
Karakida Station has one side platform and one island platform serving three tracks.

Platforms

History
The station opened on March 27, 1990.

Passenger statistics
In fiscal 2019, the station was used by an average of 17,207 passengers daily, making it the 55th busiest station in the Odakyu system.

Surrounding area
Otsuma Women's University Tama Campus
Otsuma Tama Junior and Senior High School

See also
 List of railway stations in Japan

References

External links

  

Railway stations in Tokyo
Railway stations in Japan opened in 1990
Tama, Tokyo